Steve Gaub is an American television and film producer.  He is an active member of the Producers Guild of America.  He is an Executive Producer of the television series The Witcher.

Life and career 
Steve graduated from the University of Minnesota Carlson School of Management with BS degrees in Marketing and Operations Management Systems.

He began his film career working in Minneapolis and Los Angeles in the independent film industry, as an Assistant Director and Production Manager.  He moved into Script Development at Outlaw Productions in 1999.  Following a brief stint at the independent production company Intermedia Films, he ventured into freelance work, starting as a Production Supervisor on a number of feature films.  Since then, he has gone on to serve as a Co-Producer on many feature films, including TRON: Legacy and Walt Disney's live action remake of Beauty And The Beast and Christopher Robin. Since 2018, Steve has been working as a Producer in episodic television series The Witcher.

Filmography

References 

American actors
American producers
Year of birth missing (living people)
Living people